Isochnus is a genus of beetles belonging to the family Curculionidae.

The species of this genus are found in Europe and Northern America.

Species:
 Isochnus flagellum (Erichson, 1902)
 Isochnus foliorum (Müller, 1764)

References

Curculionidae
Curculionidae genera